The Allam Cycle or Allam-Fetvedt Cycle is a process for converting carbonaceous fuels into thermal energy, while capturing the generated carbon dioxide and water. This zero emissions cycle was validated at a 50 MWth natural gas fed test facility in La Porte, Texas in May 2018. This industrial plant is owned and operated by NET Power LLC, a privately held technology licensing company. NET Power is owned by Constellation Energy Corporation, Occidental Petroleum Corporation (Oxy) Low Carbon Ventures, Baker Hughes Company and 8 Rivers Capital, the company holding the patents for the technology. The key inventors behind the process are English engineer Rodney John Allam, American engineer Jeremy Eron Fetvedt, American scientist Dr. Miles R Palmer, and American businessperson and innovator G. William Brown, Jr. The Allam-Fetvedt Cycle was recognized by MIT Technology Review on the 2018 list of 10 Breakthrough Technologies.

Description 

The Allam-Fetvedt Cycle that operates as a recuperated, high-pressure, Brayton cycle employing a transcritical  working fluid with an oxy-fuel combustion regime. This cycle begins by burning a gaseous fuel with oxygen and a hot, high-pressure, recycled supercritical  working fluid in a combustor. The recycled  stream serves the dual purpose of lowering the combustion flame temperature to a manageable level and diluting the combustion products such that the cycle working fluid is predominantly . The pressure in the combustor can be as high as approximately 30 MPa and the combustion feedstock consists of approximately 95% recycled  by mass.  The combustor provides a high-pressure exhaust that can be supplied to a turbine expander operating at a pressure ratio between 6 and 12. The expander discharge leaves as a subcritical  mixture predominantly comingled with combustion derived water. This fluid enters an economizer heat exchanger, which cools the expander discharge down to below 65 °C against the stream of  that is being recycled to the combustor. Upon exiting the economizer heat exchanger, the expander exhaust is further cooled to near ambient temperature by a central cooling system, enabling liquid water to be removed from the working fluid and recycled for beneficial use.  

The remaining working fluid of nearly pure  then enters a compression and pumping stage. The compression system consists of a conventional inter-cooled centrifugal compressor with an inlet pressure below the  critical pressure. The  working fluid is compressed and then cooled to near ambient temperature in the compressor after-cooler. At this point, the combination of compressing and cooling the working fluid permits it to achieve a density in excess of 500 kg/m3. In this condition, the  stream can be pumped to the high combustion pressure required using a multi-stage centrifugal pump.  Finally, the high-pressure working fluid is sent back through the economizer heat exchanger to be reheated and returned to the combustor.

The net  product derived from the addition of fuel and oxygen in the combustor is removed from the high-pressure stream; at this point, the  product is high-pressure and high purity, ready for sequestration or utilization without requiring further compression.

In order for the system to reach a high thermal efficiency, a close temperature approach is needed on the high-temperature side of the primary heat exchanger. Due to the cooling process employed at the compression and pumping stage of the Allam-Fetvedt Cycle, a large energy imbalance would typically exist in the cycle between the cooling expander exhaust flow and the reheating  recycle flow.

The Allam-Fetvedt Cycle corrects this imbalance through the incorporation of low-grade heat at the low-temperature end of the recuperative heat exchanger.  Due to the low temperatures at the cool end of the cycle, this low-grade heat only needs to be in the range of 100 °C to 400 °C.  A convenient source of this heat is the Air Separation Unit (ASU) required for the oxy-fuel combustion regime.

This basic configuration, when burning natural gas as a fuel, has been modeled to achieve an efficiency up to 60% (LHV) as a power cycle net of all parasitic loads, including the energy-intensive ASU. Despite its novelty, the components required by this cycle are all currently commercially available, with the exception of the combustion turbine package. The turbine relies on well-proven technologies and approaches used by existing gas and steam turbine design tools.

Applications 
Construction began in March 2016 in La Porte, Texas on a 50 MWth industrial test facility that would showcase the Allam-Fetvedt Cycle, with construction completed in 2017. In 2018, the Allam-Fetvedt Cycle and supporting technologies were validated at this demonstration plant, which now serves as a test facility, allowing OEMs to certify components for use with future Allam-Fetvedt Cycle plants. On November 15, 2021, at approximately 7:40 pm EST the test facility successfully synchronized to the ERCOT grid proving that the Allam Fetvedt Cycle was capable of generating power at 60 Hz. This test facility is owned and operated by NET Power, which is owned by Constellation Energy Corporation, Occidental Petroleum (Oxy) Low Carbon Ventures, Baker Hughes and 8 Rivers Capital (the inventor of the technology).  In recognition of the Allam-Fetvedt Cycle test facility in La Porte, Texas, NET Power was awarded the 2018 International Excellence in Energy Breakthrough Technological Project of the Year at the Abu Dhabi International Petroleum Exhibition and Conference (ADIPEC).

Patent history

See also 
 Oxy-fuel combustion process

References

External links 
 Process diagram for natural gas
 Process diagram for coal
 Mass flow diagram
 Pressure and specific enthalpy diagram

Energy conversion
Thermodynamic cycles
English inventions
Power station technology
Carbon capture and storage